Luigi Gilbert "Louis" Tomei (February 17, 1910 in Portland, Oregon – May 15, 1955 in Los Angeles) was an American racecar driver active during the 1930s and 1940s, and a stuntman active during the 1940s and 1950s.

Indy 500 results

Stunt performer

After World War II, Tomei worked as a stuntman and bit-part actor.  His most notable appearance was in A Star is Born (1954). The following year, he died doubling for actor Edward G. Robinson during the filming of the movie Hell on Frisco Bay. Tomei was performing a fight scene on a motorboat that marked the climax of the movie when he was hurled against a metal fitting on the boat. He suffered a severe head injury, and died in hospital later that night.

Filmography

Note

He is not related to the actresses Concetta Tomei and Marisa Tomei.

References

External links
Louis Tomei at Historic Racing

1910 births
1955 deaths
American stunt performers
Indianapolis 500 drivers
Racing drivers from Portland, Oregon